Leroy Blugh (born May 14, 1966) is a former professional Canadian football defensive lineman and the defensive line coach for the Queen's Gaels of U Sports football. He played for fifteen seasons in the Canadian Football League (CFL) for two different teams and was the winner of the CFL's Most Outstanding Canadian Award in 1996 and is a two-time CFL West Division All-Star and a 81st Grey Cup Champion (1993). In 2015, he was inducted into the Canadian Football Hall of Fame.

Coaching career
Blugh served as the head football coach at Bishop's University, his alma mater, from 2005 until his resignation after the 2010 season. He was named Defensive Line coach for Queen's University in August 2011 and spent two seasons with the Gaels.

After one year with the Edmonton Eskimos as their defensive line coach, he was hired by the Ottawa Redblacks to serve in the same capacity on February 3, 2014. He spent six seasons with Ottawa, highlighted by a championship win in the 104th Grey Cup game. After the Redblacks' head coach, Rick Campbell, resigned and joined the BC Lions, Blugh was announced as part of his 2020 staff on January 6, 2020. However, the team did not play in 2020 due to the cancellation of the 2020 CFL season and Blugh resigned from his position with the Lions on July 20, 2021, for personal reasons. After sitting out for one year, he was named the defensive line coach for the Queen's Gaels on June 6, 2022.

Personal life
Blugh was born in Saint Vincent and the Grenadines and grew up in Napanee, Ontario, where his family moved when he was five years old.

Notes

Further reading 
 

1966 births
Living people
BC Lions coaches
Bishop's Gaiters football players
Canadian football defensive linemen
Canadian Football Hall of Fame inductees
Canadian Football League Most Outstanding Canadian Award winners
Edmonton Elks players
People from Lennox and Addington County
Saint Vincent and the Grenadines players of Canadian football
Saint Vincent and the Grenadines sportspeople
Toronto Argonauts players
Ottawa Redblacks coaches
Edmonton Elks coaches